Arnold Henry Arenz (October 13, 1911 – January 1985) was an American football quarterback in the National Football League for the Boston Redskins.  He played college football at St. Louis University.

References

1911 births
1985 deaths
American football quarterbacks
Boston Redskins players
Saint Louis Billikens football players
People from Park Hills, Missouri